Club Esportiu Handbol Marítim, also known as Valencia Aicequip, was a Spanish women's handball club from Valencia. In 2012 became the successor of national powerhouse BM Sagunto.

The club was disbanded in June 2013 due to large debts inherited from the BM Sagunto period. Its sports rights were transferred to new created club Club Handbol Canyamelar.

Season to season

6 seasons in División de Honor

References

External links
Official website

Sport in Valencia
Sports teams in the Valencian Community
Spanish handball clubs
Handball clubs established in 1997
Sports clubs disestablished in 2013
Defunct handball clubs